Vignola is a surname. Notable people with the surname include:

 Beniamino Vignola (b. 1959), Italian former footballer
 Frank Vignola (b. 1965), American jazz guitarist
 Gaetano Vignola, Italian accelerator physicist
 Giacomo Barozzi da Vignola (1507 – 1573), Italian architect
 Julie Vignola, Canadian politician 
 Joe Vignola (b. 1949), American politician 
 Karina Vignola (b. 1976), Uruguayan television presenter
 Robert G. Vignola (1882 – 1953), Italian-American actor, screenwriter and film director

See also 

 Vignola (disambiguation)